The Vietnam agile skink (Subdoluseps vietnamensis) is a species of skink found in Vietnam.

References

Subdoluseps
Reptiles described in 2021